Tasenia is a genus of moths of the family Crambidae. It contains only one species, Tasenia nigromaculalis, which is found on Java.

References

Natural History Museum Lepidoptera genus database

Pyraustinae
Crambidae genera
Taxa named by Pieter Cornelius Tobias Snellen
Monotypic moth genera